Gianantonio Zopegni (8 March 1915 – 10 September 2001) was an Italian ice hockey player. He competed in the men's tournament at the 1948 Winter Olympics.

References

External links
 

1915 births
2001 deaths
Ice hockey people from Milan
Ice hockey players at the 1948 Winter Olympics
Italian ice hockey players
Olympic ice hockey players of Italy